The Lenormant Athena is the name given to a small Greek statuette which was made in the first century CE.

The Lenormant Athena was discovered in 1859 near the Pnyx hill in Athens and identified by François Lenormant a year later as a small copy of the Athena Parthenos of Phidias. The 41 cm high pentelic marble sculpture has thus come to be known by his name. The unfinished work is of great art historical significance, since it not only shows us what Phidias' statue looked like, but also the reliefs on her shield and the base on which she stood, which are otherwise only known from literary sources.

Athena stands in a quiet, graceful pose, resting her weight on her right leg. She is dressed in an Attic peplos. Her left arm rests on her shield. An Amazonomachy is depicted on the shield. In her right hand, which rests on a strong support, Athena must have held a Nike, which has not survived. The unfinished base depicts the birth of Pandora. The back is still in an unfinished state as well.

Today the statuette is stored in the National Archaeological Museum, Athens with the inventory number 128.

Bibliography

 Nikolaos Kaltsas: Sculpture in the National Archaeological Museum, Athens. The J. Paul Getty Museum, Los Angeles 2002 , p. 106.

Archaeological discoveries in Greece
National Archaeological Museum, Athens
Marble sculptures in Greece
1st-century artifacts
Sculptures by Phidias
Roman copies of 5th-century BC Greek sculptures
Sculptures in Athens
1859 archaeological discoveries
Sculptures of Athena
Unfinished sculptures